This is a list of notable Presbyterian churches in the United States, where a church is notable either as a congregation or as a building.  In the United States, numerous churches are listed on the National Register of Historic Places or are noted on state or local historic registers.  Also more than 300 Presbyterian historic sites have been listed by the Presbyterian Historical Society onto the American Presbyterian/Reformed Historic Sites Registry (APRHS);  those sites which are churches are ... in progress ... being added here.

This article also includes related other items, such as various former Presbyterian meetinghouse sites, or cemeteries or parsonages that are NRHP-listed where the corresponding church building is more modern and not NRHP-listed.

Alabama

Alaska

Arizona

Arkansas

California

Colorado

Connecticut

Delaware

District of Columbia

Florida

Georgia

Idaho

Illinois

Indiana

Iowa

Kansas

Kentucky

Louisiana

Maryland

Massachusetts

Michigan

Minnesota

Mississippi

Missouri

Montana

Nebraska

Nevada

New Hampshire

New Jersey

New Mexico

New York

North Carolina

North Dakota

Ohio

Oklahoma

Oregon

Pennsylvania

South Carolina

South Dakota

Tennessee

Texas

Utah

Virginia

Washington

West Virginia

Wisconsin

Wyoming

See also
List of Presbyterian churches, worldwide

References

Presbyterian